Transmissions is the 1993 debut album by the multi-genre trance group Juno Reactor.

Track lists
"High Energy Protons" (Watkins, Maguire) – 6:33
"The Heavens" (Watkins, Holweck) – 6:27
"Luna-Tic" (Watkins, Waldeback) – 9:01
"Contact" (Watkins, Holweck) – 5:53
"Acid Moon" (Watkins, Waldeback) – 8:39
"10,000 Miles" (Watkins, Holweck) – 5:55
"Laughing Gas" (Watkins, Holweck) – 8:05
"Man to Ray" (Watkins, Maguire, Holweck) – 6:43
"Landing"  (Watkins, Waldeback, Maguire) – 8:42

Samples

 On "High Energy Protons": "Everything is going extremely well. You are the brain and central nervous system" is from the film 2001: A Space Odyssey.
 On "High Energy Protons": "High energy protons spilling over into our atmosphere" is spoken by the character Marina in the film Local Hero in reference to the aurora borealis.
 On "Man to Ray": "You know the moon … you know the star" is taken from a scene set in Australia in the film The Right Stuff.
 On "Luna-Tic": "I was walking on the moon one day…" is the voice of astronaut Harrison Schmitt during a moonwalk on the Apollo 17 lunar mission in December 1972.

Personnel
Mari Naylor - Vocals (2)
Annie Fontaine - Vocals (6)

Credits
All tracks produced and mixed by Juno Reactor
Engineered by Otto the Barbarian, assisted by Nahoko Sadada
Edit man Neal Snyman

Release history
NovaMute Records: 1993, NOMU24CD

References

External links
Juno Reactor Official Website

1993 debut albums
Juno Reactor albums
Trance albums